The Swedish Handball Cup is the nationwide cup tournament for handball teams in Sweden. It's also known as ATG Svenska cupen for sponsorship reasons. The competition was at first held between 1968 and 1991, and then brought back in 2021.

The cup starts with a group phase, followed by a knockout stage where the teams face each other home and away. From the 2023/24 season there will instead be held a Final four event.

Past winners Men's Cup

Past winners Women's Cup

References

Handball competitions in Sweden
Recurring sporting events established in 1968
Annual sporting events in Sweden